is a Japanese actress. She graduated from Private Tokiwa Girls High School.

Filmography

TV series

References

External links
 Official profile at VBP 

Japanese actresses
1978 births
Living people
Actors from Ibaraki Prefecture